Janine Gordon (born 1972 or 1973), better known by her professional name Jah Jah or MC Jah Jah, is an American rapper, photographer, and multimedia artist.

Rap career 
Jah Jah is an independent artist who is currently working without a major label. Her first record deal was with E-magine music entitled "The Art of Hip Hop", produced with Chubb Rock in 2002. Since 2005 she has been working almost exclusively with Quickmix who produced "The Attack","Lawless" and "Intelligence Report".
In 2002 she was on an episode of Texas Justice as a plaintiff against producers who did not produce industry standard quality music. She gave a live rap performance to the judge on this daytime television show and won. In 2003 she went to São Paulo Brazil for over a year and worked with a group of rapper and reggae artists including Jimmy Luv and Grand Master Duda, producing two albums. Jah Jah performed extensively at various clubs in Brazil and a television appearances on The Syange Show.
Jah Jah appeared on the first episode of ego trip's The (White) Rapper Show, but according to her  they did not select her because she was overqualified and outshone the other contestants.
Jah Jah got her start in rap by freestyling with other artists, known and underground hip hop scene during the '90s. It was here that she met many other artists such as Redman, Chubb Rock, and The Beatnuts. "I was encouraged meeting Redman and The Beatnuts. Redman called me out in his song back in 97'" stated the rapper in an interview. She has a very wide fan base on Myspace and has experienced some success with her music overseas in Brazil. Jah Jah was able to remain within the top 10 artists for over a year on the Myspace music chart.

Lawsuit against 50 Cent
In 2005, Jah Jah filed a copyright infringement lawsuit against 50 Cent and Dr. Dre for allegedly stealing her music and using it illegally for 50's Massacre album.

Discography 
 The Art of Hip Hop (2002)
 Take a Lick Take a Bite (2005)
 The Attack (2007)
 Musica Do Brasil (2008)
 Intelligence Report (2010)
 Lawless (2010)

Art work 
Jah Jah has art, notably photography, that has appeared in magazines such as Arena and galleries in New York City, San Francisco, Brazil, and  Europe. Her visual art work is credited under her real name, Janine Gordon. She also has a master's degree in fine art from New York University.

Exhibitions 
Here are the exhibitions that Janine's art has been featured in:

Solo exhibitions

 2008 MV Art Projects, Zurich
 2007/08 Elga Wimmer Gallery, New York
 2006 Les Rencontres d'Arles festival, France: laureate of the Discovery Award
 2006 Galerie Kamel Mennour, Paris
 2005 Galerie Volker Diehl, Berlin, Germany
 2005 Galerie Kamel Mennour, Paris
 2004 Oliver Kamm Gallery, New York
 2002 Deitch Projects, New York Galerie Volker Diehl, Berlin XL Xavier LaBoulbenne, New York
 2001 Refusalon Gallery, San Francisco
 1998/99 ANP, Antwerpen
 1996 John Gibson Gallery, New York
 1995 White Columns, New York ìIn Vitroî, Art Contemporain, Geneva, curated by Lionel Bovier

Group exhibitions

 2008 Art for Life, benefit with Rush Arts at Russell Simmons CNEAI, France, curated by John Armleder and Mai-Thu Perret No Milk Today, Autoversion Ltd. New York City The Other Side, The 58 Gallery, NJ, curated by Billy Miller Artist as Publisher, The Center for Book Arts___ In A Boxî, Canco, Jersey City, Curated by B. Miller Circulo Azul, Mexico curated by Elga Wimmer El Aire, Mexico, curated by Elga Wimmer Diva Art Fair, Elga Wimmer Black Noise, project with John Armleder, MAMCO, Switzerland Invisible Museum, Devon Dikeu via Denver Art Museum Do the Right Bling, Stedelijk Museum, Holland Youth of Today, Shirinkunstalle, Germany Moscow Art Fair, Moscow, Galerie Volker Diehl MACO, Mexico Art fair, Elga Wimmer Extension 17. The Swiss Institute, NYC, Paris Photo 2005, Galerie Volker Diehl Summer group show, Mitchell ñIness and Nash
 2004 Will Boys Will Be Boys, curated by Shamim Momim The Armory, NY, Galerie Volker Diehl Palais de Tokyo ((((LIVE)))), Curated by Jerome Sans Rimbaud, I-20 Gallery, curated by Max Henry Teenage Kicks, Royal Hiberian Academy. Dublin, Ireland Affordable art fair,  Oliver Kamm/5BE, NADA Art Fair Miami, Mitchell-Innes and Nash Gallery- Art Basel Miami Beach, booth; The Drawing Center Benefit selections A Moments Notice, Inman Gallery, Texas Robert York Gallery, NYC
 2002 Highlights from the Permanent Photography Collection The Armory, Paul Morris Gallery The Bathroom show, Daniel Riech, NY BOMB, curated Brooklyn Front Gallery, Brooklyn Come to Life, curated by Noritoshi Hirakawa Hot Groove, Gallery M, NY Ottokringer Brewrei, Vienna
 2001 Whitney Biennial, 2001, The Whitney Museum of American Art Pollock to Today: Highlights from the Permanent Collection Whitney Museum of American Art, New York Directory, Swiss Institute New York, curated by Marc-Olivier Wahler Masculinities Nikolaj Contemporary Art Center of Copenhagen, "Guide to trust No.2", Yerba Buena Center for the arts, curated by Jimi Dams "Peppermint", Smack Melon, Brooklyn, NY, curated by Dermis Leon    "The Conclusion of a Paradox", Venetia Kapernikas Gallery, curated by Noritoshi Hirakawa "The Last Year", Salle de Bains, Rotterdam "LoVe", Cynthia Braun Gallery, New York "Bloom", Lolocolmo, Brescia
 1998 Identity Crisis, Spencer Brownstone Gallery, New York Male, Wessel O ëConnor Gallery, New York, curated by Vince Aletti
 1996 "Voyeurs Delight", Franklin Furnace, New York "The Most Important Thing in the World, Oasis Vs.Blur and artists who Rock", curated by Bill Arning " Non! Pas comme ca!", CAN, Neuchatel, curated by Marc-Olivier Wahler

References

External links

Janine Gordon "Stunting" Gallery
Jah Jah's Official Myspace
Galerie Volker Diehl: Janine Gordon Works
Janine Gordon's Works in the Dikeou Collection

American women rappers
Living people
Photographers from New York (state)
Rappers from Brooklyn
Year of birth missing (living people)
21st-century American rappers
21st-century American women musicians
21st-century American women photographers
21st-century American photographers
21st-century women rappers